Androgen (medication) may refer to:

 Testosterone (medication)
 Androgen replacement therapy
 Anabolic steroid

See also
 Androgen